Polina Rasina (born 12 March 1999) is a Bulgarian footballer who plays as a forward for Pirin Ladies and the Bulgaria women's national team.

International career
Rasina capped for Bulgaria at senior level in a 0–6 friendly loss to Croatia on 14 June 2019.

References

1999 births
Living people
Women's association football forwards
Bulgarian women's footballers
Bulgaria women's international footballers